The Battle of the Volturno refers to a series of military clashes between Giuseppe Garibaldi's volunteers and the troops of the Kingdom of Two Sicilies occurring around the river Volturno, between the cities of Capua and Caserta in northern Campania, in September and October 1860. The main battle took place on the 1 October 1860 between 30,000 Garibaldines (mostly defected Sicilians, including from Calabria) and 25,000 Bourbon troops (Neapolitans).

Background
After Garibaldi's Expedition of Thousand had conquered Sicily and much of southern Italy with a startling speed, entering in Naples on the 7 September while the King Francis II of Two Sicilies took refuge in the powerful fortress of Gaeta, midway between Rome and Naples. In the meantime the Neapolitan army was rebuilt in Capua under marshal Giosuè Ritucci, the first skirmishes with Garibaldi's volunteers occurring on the 26 and 29 September.

On the 30 September a Neapolitan corps crossed the river Volturno at Triflisco, marching towards Santa Maria a Vologno, but was halted by two Garibaldine brigades. The following day Ritucci then decided a frontal attack with two divisions against Garibaldi's centre, which occupied a line running from Sant'Angelo in Formis and Santa Maria a Vico. After defeating the enemy, Ritucci was to reach Caserta and then Naples itself.

Garibaldi wanted to cross the Volturno, keeping the Neapolitan Army against Capua, while he prevented King Francis II from reaching Gaeta. However, the Neapolitan Army attempted a double-envelopment of Garibaldi between their Capua forces, and those Mechel and Ruia at Dugenta.

Battle
On 1 October, before 6am, Neapolitan General Anfan de Rivera attacked Giacomo Medici at Sant'Angelo, Tabacchi and Ruggeri attacked Milbiz at Santa Maria, and Mechel advanced upon Nino Bixio at Maddaloni.  Garibaldi sent reinforcements to Milbiz and Medici. At 2pm, Medici and Milbiz counterattacked, forcing the Neapolitans towards Capua. By later afternoon, Mechel also withdrew.

Consequences

According to Schneid, "Garibaldi narrowly won the battle of Volturno. The Southern Army placed Capua under siege, and the Piedmontese forces marched on Gaeta where the erstwhile Neapolitan king had taken refuge."

The cost for Garibaldi in men was higher: 306 killed and 1,327 wounded, but the Neapolitan forces had lost almost 1,000 in killed and wounded themselves and over 2,000 taken prisoner. The Bourbon army was unable to use its victory to capture Caserta. Both armies showed bravery, except perhaps for the Royal Guards and troops of Ruiz de Ballesteros, who were the largest cause of the defeat.

Garibaldi was forced to request troops from the Piedmontese. Yet while Francesco II wished to use the impasse for the Garibaldi forces, to attack again, his generals recommended that the troops be reorganised. Thus he left Capua for Gaeta, and was unable to retake his throne. Soon Piedmontese reinforcements arrived, defeating the Royal troops at Gaeta, and causing the King to flee.

See also
Risorgimento
Siege of Gaeta (1860)

References

External links
 Cerino Badone Giovanni, Volturno 1860. L'ultima battaglia, in Commissione Italiana di Storia Militare, Società Italiana di Storia Militare, L'anno di Teano, Atti del Convegno Nazione CISM-SISM su il Risorgimento e l'Europa, Roma 2011, pp. 273–307. Volume degli atti , testo dell'articolo , tavole ed illustrazioni .
.

Notes

Conflicts in 1860
Battles of the Expedition of the Thousand
Battles involving the Kingdom of Naples
Volturno
1860 in Italy
October 1860 events